Pollenia hungarica is a species of cluster fly in the family Polleniidae.

Distribution
Austria, Czech Republic, Finland, France, Germany, Hungary, Italy, Latvia, Netherlands, Norway, Poland, Russia, Saudi Arabia, Slovakia, Sweden, Switzerland, Ukraine, Yugoslavia. Introduced to China.

References

Polleniidae
Insects described in 1987
Diptera of Europe